The Mastogloia Sea is one of the prehistoric stages of the Baltic Sea in its development after the last ice age. This took place  8000 years ago following the Ancylus Lake stage and preceding the Littorina Sea stage.

Overview
Towards its demise, the Ancylus Lake was falling, having partly eroded and scouring away at its new outlet at the Great Belt. It reached sea level  8500 years ago, making it the Mastogloia Sea.

At this time global sea level was rising rapidly due to the melting of vast tracts of the great ice age ice sheets. As a result, some sea (salt) water started to penetrate into the basin through the Danish straits, mixing into the vast freshwater body. This led to the stage's slightly brackish conditions in the Baltic.

This phase of the body of water takes its name from the brackish water-dwelling diatom genus Mastogloia, the species of which are characteristic of the geological deposits of this stage.

Continuing sea level rise during this stage deepened the straits connecting the body with the ocean, thus increasing the influx of salt water.

A great hydrographic shift occurred  8500 years ago, which corresponds to shifts in currents in the Skagerrak, Kattegat and the Norwegian Channel, as they transition to the modern circulation system in the eastern North Sea. This is a consequence of the opening, and deepening, of Strait of Dover and the Danish straits and increased Atlantic water inflow. Thereafter this caused the South Jutland Current.

Between 8000 and 7000 years ago the body of water became brackish, starting from the southern parts closest to the ocean and spreading to its centre and finally the shallow, ice-prone, well-watered Gulf of Finland and Gulf of Bothnia.

Successor
The phase of more saline conditions and higher sea level than today marks the Littorina Sea stage.

The Mastogloia Sea stage thus is between the freshwater Ancylus Lake stage and the Littorina Sea stage.

Disputed status

Many researchers have been unwilling to recognize the Mastogloia Sea as a separate stage in the development of the Baltic Sea, favouring including it in either the Ancylus Lake stage or the Littorina Sea stage.

In stratigraphy of Baltic sediments the Mastogloia stage is difficult to detect, its sediments being visibly identical to those of the Ancylus Lake. Even the fossil diatom content of the phase's sediments – cited by researchers as the key method of distinguishing deposits of different Baltic stages – is ambiguous, in many places showing no difference from that of Ancylus deposits, and at best including an admixture of Mastogloia diatoms in an otherwise typical Ancylus flora. Deposits of the Littorina Sea phase show a drastic change both in the visible characteristics of the sediment and its diatoms. Some academics prefer to include the phase as the early Littorina Sea stage, being the time after resumption of a marine (sea) connection.

In spite of these objections, though, the concept of the phase persists in literature concerning the development of the Baltic Sea. It has been noted that it is useful in maintaining the clarity of the system, delimiting the period with undeniable if slight marine influence following the fall of the Ancylus Lake to sea level that pre-dates the great changes from the outset of the Littorina Sea stage.

Notes

References

 
 Donner, J. (1995) The Quaternary History of Scandinavia. Cambridge University Press, 210 pp. 
 Eronen, M. (1974) The history of the Litorina Sea and associated Holocene events. Societas Scientarum Fennicae, Commentationes Physico-Mathematicae 44, 79–195.
 Eronen, M. (1983) Late Weichselian and Holocene shore displacement in Finland. In Smith, D. E. and Dawson, A. G. (eds.) Shorelines and Isostasy, Academic Press, London, 183–207.
 
 Hyvärinen, H., Donner, J., Kessel, H., and Raukas, A. (1988) The Litorina Sea and Limnaea Sea in the Northern and Central Baltic.. In Donner, J. and Raukas, A. (eds.) Problems of the Baltic Sea History, Annales Academiae Scientarum Fennicae A III 148, 13–23.
 Miettinen, A. (2002) Relative sea level changes in the eastern part of the Gulf of Finland during the last 8000 years. Annales Academiae Scientiarum Fennicae, Geologica-Geographica 162, 100 pp.
 

History of the Baltic Sea
8th millennium BC